Sempere is a surname. Notable people with the surname include:

África Sempere (born 1992), Spanish handballer
César Sempere (born 1984), Spanish rugby union player
Eusebio Sempere (1923–1985), Spanish sculptor, painter and graphic artist
Eva García Sempere (born 1976), Spanish politician
José Manuel Sempere (born 1958), Spanish footballer